Joginder Singh Mann, is an Indian politician and former Minister. He is a member of the Aam Aadmi Party.

Early life 
Joginder Singh Mann was born into Sikh jaat community to Puran Singh at Phagwara, Punjab. He is also the National President of All India Rangretta Dal.

Politics 
He is a three-time MLA from Phagwara Constituency on Congress ticket.

Minister in the Council of Ministers led by former Chief Ministers Late Beant Singh and Harcharan Singh Brar besides Rajinder Kaur Bhattal and Capt Amarinder Singh.

He became chairman of the Punjab Agro Industries Corporation (PAIC).

He contested unsuccessfully in the 2022 Punjab Legislative Assembly election.

References 

Punjab, India MLAs 2002–2007
1946 births
Living people
Aam Aadmi Party politicians from Punjab, India